Moussa Koïta (born November 19, 1982) is a former French-Senegalese footballer who played as a striker.

Career 
After just one year and 25 games, he scored six goals with SC Schiltigheim in the Championnat de France Amateurs and left the club and signed a contract with R.E. Virton. On 12 June 2009 K.R.C. Genk signed the Franco-Senegalese forward from R.E. Virton on a two-year deal. In February 2010, R. Charleroi S.C. loaned him for the remainder of the season, while Orlando moved to Genk.
Koita signed with Bulgarian Chernomorets Burgas for two years on 31 August 2010. He made his team début on 13 September in an 0–0 A PFG match against OFC Sliven 2000. In July 2011, he was released from the club.
In August 2011, he signed for Cypriot First Division club, Olympiakos Nicosia for 1 year.

Schools 
2005-2006 : University NANCY-METZ galiléé

2001 - 2003 : University PARIS 13

1997 - 2001: Lycée Paul Eluard in Saint Denis

1993 - 1997: Collége Fabien

References

External links
 
 KOITA Moussa - wiki.lexcel.be
 Moussa KOITA, Lycée Paul Eluard
 
 

1982 births
Living people
Association football forwards
French footballers
Senegalese footballers
French sportspeople of Senegalese descent
FC Mulhouse players
ASPV Strasbourg players
R.E. Virton players
K.R.C. Genk players
R. Charleroi S.C. players
PFC Chernomorets Burgas players
Olympiakos Nicosia players
Expatriate footballers in Belgium
Expatriate footballers in Bulgaria
Expatriate footballers in Cyprus
First Professional Football League (Bulgaria) players
Cypriot First Division players
Belgian Pro League players
Challenger Pro League players